is a Japanese light novel by  and illustrated by . A live-action film adaptation was released on April 23, 2011.

Plot

Half a year ago, high school student Yūya was introduced to Mirai, his younger sister. Yūya knows very little about Mirai other than the fact that she used to be a magical girl. He watches over Mirai in place of their busy single mother, and the more Yūya gets to know Mirai, the more his boring life seems to change. However, Mirai eventually reveals that as a result of losing her magical powers, people will soon lose their memories of her.

Characters

Portrayed by: Ryuki Takahashi
Yūya is a high school student who considers his life to be dull.

Portrayed by: 
Mirai is a former magical girl who can no longer use magic and other people are no longer able to remember who she is.

Portrayed by: Suzuka Morita
Chika is Yūya's childhood friend who secretly is in love with him.

Portrayed by: Masahiro Usui
Naoki is Yūya's classmate who dreams of becoming a musician and is in love with Mirai.

Media

Light novel
It was published by Shueisha under the Super Dash Bunko imprint.

Film

A live-action film adaptation was released on April 23, 2011, starring D-Boys member Ryuki Takahashi, Idoling!!! member Suzuka Morita, and D-Boys member Masahiro Usui. The film's theme song is "Kimi ga Ita Shirushi" by Jurian Beat Crisis. Filming took place in Fukuoka and lasted for two weeks.

Reception

For the live-action adaptation, Real Live reviewed the film favorably, commenting how the director, Teiichi Hori, is able to "replicate" the "sweet and sour youth" from light novels.

References

Japanese novels adapted into films
Magical girl light novels
Japanese drama films